The following is a list of Sites of Special Scientific Interest in the Dumbarton and North Glasgow  Area of Search. For other areas, see List of SSSIs by Area of Search.

 Aber Bog, Gartocharn Bog and Bell Moss
 Auchenreoch Glen
 Auchensail Quarry
 Balglass Corries
 Ben Vorlich
 Bishop Loch
 Blairbeich Bog
 Boturich Woodlands
 Cadder Wilderness
 Caldarvan Loch
 Cart and Kittoch Valleys
 Corrie Burn
 Dullatur Marsh
 Dumbarton Muir
 Dumbarton Rock 
 Endrick Mouth and Islands
 Endrick Water
 Fossil Grove
 Garabal Hill
 Geal and Dubh Lochs
 Geilston Burn
 Glen Loin
 Glenarbuck
 Hawcraigs, Glenarbuck
 Inchlonaig
 Inchmoan
 Inchmurrin
 Inchtavannach and Inchconnachan
 Inner Clyde
 Lang Craigs
 Loch Humphrey Burn
 Manse Burn
 Mollinsburn Road Cutting
 Mugdock Wood
 Pollochro Woods
 Portnellan - Ross Priory - Claddochside
 Possil Marsh
 Rhu Point
 Ross Park
 Ross Park - Lochshore Woodland
 Sculliongour Limestone Quarry
 Slamannan Plateau
 South Braes
 Waulkmill Glen
 West Fannyside Moss
 West Loch Lomondside Woodlands

 
Dumbarton and North Glasgow